Longicatena is a genus from the family of Erysipelotrichidae with one known species (Longicatena caecimuris). Longicatena caecimuris has been isolated from the caecal content from a mouse from Freising in Germany.

References 

Erysipelotrichia
Bacteria genera
Taxa described in 2016
Monotypic bacteria genera